The Santonian is an age in the geologic timescale or a chronostratigraphic stage. It is a subdivision of the Late Cretaceous Epoch or Upper Cretaceous Series. It spans the time between 86.3 ± 0.7 mya (million years ago) and 83.6 ± 0.7 mya. The Santonian is preceded by the Coniacian and is followed by the Campanian.

Stratigraphic definition
The Santonian Stage was established by French geologist Henri Coquand in 1857. It is named after the city of Saintes in the region of Saintonge, where the original type locality is located.

The base of the Santonian Stage is defined by the appearance of the inoceramid bivalve Cladoceramus undulatoplicatus. The GSSP (official reference profile) for the base of the Santonian Stage is located near Olazagutia, Spain; it was ratified by the Subcommission on Cretaceous Stratigraphy in 2012. The Santonian's top (the base of the Campanian Stage) is informally marked by the extinction of the crinoid Marsupites testudinarius.  A GSSP for the top of the Santonian was ratified in October 2022 in Bottaccione, Gubbio, Italy.

Subdivision
The Santonian is sometimes subdivided into Lower, Middle and Upper Substages. In the Tethys domain the Santonian is coeval with a single ammonite biozone: that of Placenticeras polyopsis. Biostratigraphy based on inoceramids, nanoplankton or forams is more detailed.

References

Notes

Literature
; 2004: A Geologic Time Scale 2004, Cambridge University Press.

External links
GeoWhen Database - Santonian
Late Cretaceous timescale, at the website of the subcommission for stratigraphic information of the ICS
Stratigraphic chart of the Late Cretaceous, at the website of Norges Network of offshore records of geology and stratigraphy

 
04
Geological ages
Cretaceous geochronology